Benzo[c]thiophene is an organic compound with the chemical formula C8H6S.

The similarly named Benzo[b]thiophene is an isomer with the sulfur in the position adjacent to the benzene ring.  Benzo[b]thiophene is more stable and far more commonly encountered.

References 

Benzo(c)thiophenes
Simple aromatic rings